
Gmina Płużnica is a rural gmina (administrative district) in Wąbrzeźno County, Kuyavian-Pomeranian Voivodeship, in north-central Poland.

Villages
Gmina Płużnica contains the villages and settlements of Bągart, Bartoszewice, Bielawy, Błędowo, Czaple, Dąbrówka, Działowo, Goryń, Józefkowo, Kotnowo, Mgowo, Nowa Wieś Królewska, Orłowo, Ostrowo, Płąchawy, Płużnica, Pólko, Uciąż, Wieldządz and Wiewiórki.

Neighbouring gminas
Gmina Płużnica is bordered by the gminas of Chełmno, Chełmża, Grudziądz, Lisewo, Radzyń Chełmiński, Stolno and Wąbrzeźno.

References
Polish official population figures 2006

Pluznica
Wąbrzeźno County